Gustave M. Bugniazet (December 21, 1878 – March 25, 1960) was an American labor union leader.

Born in New York City, Bugniazet became an electrician, and joined the International Brotherhood of Electrical Workers in 1902.  In 1911, he was elected as vice president of the union, and then in 1925 as its international secretary.  He also served as a vice-president of the American Federation of Labor (AFL).  Bugniazet was a strong supporter of craft unionism, and when the Congress of Industrial Organizations split away, Bugniazet persuaded some other labor union leaders to remain with the AFL.

In 1947, Bugniazet left his union post, to become president of the American Standard Life Insurance Company.  He held the post until 1954, when he retired.

References

1878 births
1960 deaths
American trade union leaders
People from New York City
Trade unionists from New York (state)